Council elections for the City of Preston, Lancashire were held on 3 May 2018 as part of the 2018 United Kingdom local elections. Due to the "in thirds" system employed in Preston local elections, the previous elections to Preston council occurred in the 2014 Preston City Council election, consequently this means gains, losses, and vote share comparisons this year are with those fought in 2014.

All locally registered electors (British, Irish, Commonwealth and European Union citizens) who are aged 18 or over on polling day are entitled to vote in the local elections.

Election result

Ward results

Brookfield

Cadley

College

Fishwick

Garrison

Greyfriars
Due to the resignation of Damien Moore there will be a double election making direct comparison with 2014 impossible.

Ingol

Larches

Lea

Moor Park

Preston Rural North

Ribbleton

Riversway

Sharoe Green

St George's

St Matthew's

Town Centre

Tulketh

University

References 

2018
2018 English local elections
2010s in Lancashire